Kings and Queens may refer to:

A royal family, which often consists of kings and/or queens

Music

Albums
Kings & Queens (Sham 69 album), 1993
Kings & Queens (The Gits album), 1996
Kings and Queens (Axel Rudi Pell album), 2004
Kings and Queens (Anti-Nowhere League album), 2005
Kings and Queens (Jamie T album), 2009
Kings & Queens (Eddie Kirkland album), 2012
Kings & Queens (Audio Adrenaline album), 2013

Songs
"Kings and Queens" (Aerosmith song), 1978
"Kings and Queens" (Killing Joke song), 1985
"Kings and Queens" (Thirty Seconds to Mars song), 2009
"Kings & Queens" (Audio Adrenaline song), 2012
"Kings & Queens" (Ava Max song), 2020
"Kings and Queens", a song from the 2005 album The Circle of Life by Freedom Call
"Kings & Queens", a song by New Zealand singer/songwriter Brooke Fraser
"Kings & Queens", a song by Luna Halo from their self-titled album
"King & Queens", a song by Tyga from Careless World: Rise of the Last King

See also
King and Queen (disambiguation)
Kings and Queen, 2004 French film
Queens and Kings, a 2007 album by Fanfare Ciocărlia
List of monarchs